Ovanes Ohanian (October 1896 – September 1960) was an Armenian-Iranian filmmaker, inventor, founder, doctor, scientist with PhD in medicine, film, science and languages. He established the first film school in the history of Iran. His first film, Abi and Rabi (1930) was Iran's first feature-length movie. He founded the first acting school in Iran and the first acting school in India together with the first police school in Iran. He was fluent in seven languages. He died of Heart attack in his office in Tehran. The museum in Tehran contains relevant information of his life.

Biography 
Ovanes Ohanian was born in 1896 in Mashhad, Iran, the son of a father named Gregory. He studied film at the Cinema Academy of Moscow and then returned to Iran. In 1924, he went to India to form the first film school in India. After facing many difficulties, he went to Iran in 1930 to form the first film acting and technical school in Tehran; his goal was to establish a film industry in the country.

Since he found it impossible to initiate any production without professionals in the field, Ohanian decided to begin a film school in Tehran. Within five years he managed to run the first session of the school under the name: "Parvareshgahe Artistiye cinema" (The Cinema Artist Educational Centre). Acting and performance, rather than film production, were the cornerstones of the institution.

After five months, with a few of his graduates and the financial help of a theatre owner, Ohanian directed Abi and Rabi (1930). The film, lensed by Mo'tazedi, was shot silent on 35mm black and white stock and ran 1,400 meters long. 
As Ghafari states: "This film was patterned directly after the comic acts of the Danish cinema couple Pat and Paterson. Iranians had seen [films of] this couple many times in the cinemas and liked them."

Abi and Rabi was received well by critics and the public. Unfortunately the only copy of the film burnt to ashes two years after its release in a fire accident in cinema Mayak, one of the first theatres in Tehran.

In 1933, Ovanes released the movie Haji Agha Actor (sometimes translated as Mr. Haji the Moive Actor). Ovanes directed and starred in the movie as the movie-directing suitor of Mr. Haji's daughter. The film was a reflexive construction about a traditionalist who is suspicious of cinema, but by the end of story recognizes the significance of film art. |The film did not do well at the box office. Not only were there technical shortcomings, but additionally, the release of the first Persian talkie (produced in India) diminished its prospects for profit. After the failure of his second film, Ohanian could not find any support for further activities. He left Iran for India and continued his academic career in Calcutta. Subsequently he returned to Iran in 1947, where he died seven years later.

Professional biography 

Published by the International Federation of Scientific Research Societies
(Asia, Africa, Australia, Europe & America)

Academic Professor Dr. O. G. Ohanian (Mojdeh)
D. Sc. (h.c.); D. C. Sc., M.D, Deputy President of the
International Federation of Scientific Research Societies;
Acting President of the International Motion Picture Institute
Of Asia; member of the Committee of the International
Academy of Sciences and Letters; member of the International
Medical Research Institute of Asia; member of the
Royal institute for Asian Society in London.

Academician Professor Dr. O. G Ohanian, D. C. Sc., (Academia Asiatica). D. Sc, M. D. (I. F. S. R. S.), 
India. M. R. C. A. S. (London). His activities in sciences and arts:

Mojdeh is his literary pseudonym.

Education 

Commercial College in Tashkent in 1919. Law in Ashgabat
In 1920. Motion Picture Institute Moscow
Doctor of Motion Picture in 1932
Degrees: Doctor of sciences in 1941
Doctor of Medicine in 1953.
Activities in the field of the Motion Picture:
Founder of first Indian school of acting and motion picture in Calcutta 1924,
Amongst his first graduates Mr, Raj kapoor
Member of the First Motion Picture Congress held in Moscow in 1928 where such prominent film specialists a Poudovkin, Eizenstein, Alexandroff and others have been members too.
Member of the Committee of Russian Film Supporters (C.S.O.D.S.K.) since 1926 – 28 in Moscow.
Member of all Russian Film Specialists since 1928 (A.R.R.K). Founder and the administrative faculty in the Motion Picture Institute (G. T. K.) in Moscow 1927.
President and Instructor of motion Picture Experimental Screen Acting Laboratory since 1926 – 28 in Moscow.
One of five members of the Revision Commission of all Russian Film Specialists in 1928 in Moscow (S.S.O.D.S.K.)
Founder and Secretary of Turkmenistan Film Specialists in Ashgabat since 1928 -29. President of Scenario Writers of all Turkmenistan since 1928 – 29.
He was principle and instructor in cinema institute for 17 years for training of cinema actors and film directors in Asia 1925–1942.
Scenario writer and film director of the first & one of the best Turkmenian film "Gull and Italmas" in 1929 in Ashgabat (Turkmen film)
Founder and Principal of the first Motion Picture School in Iran. This was later recognised as the International Motion Picture Institute of Asia which was accepted as one of the many institutions of the International Federation of Scientific Research Societies.
Bureau of the International Federation of Scientific Research Societies.
Bureau of the International Motion Picture Institute:
Prof. Said Nafici – President, Prof O.G. Ohanian Acting President.
Abba Massoudi – Deputy President (Senator). Ahmad Deikhan – General Secretary (M.P).
Akavian – Joint Secretary, H. Moorad – Treasurer. Satu Roy – Representative in India, Ali Vakili (Senator) J. Mirzayants, (M.P.) as honorary members.
Members in India: Prof Apte, Sohrab Modi, F.H Sidwa (Globe Theatres), H.C Patel (Opera House Cinema) P.C. Kapadia (Evergreens Pictures) in Bombay, Satu Roy (Film Director). Chandra sohekhar (Editor of Calcutta Display weekly)
Founder of the film production and screen acting education in Iran 1929-1936

Amongst his pupil received diploma have been: the late Ahmad Deikhan (Member of Parliament) Shahani, Gorji, Moorad, Kodbi, Rashidi, Kobadi, Sooltani, Edalatpoor, and Saphi. Eng. Zarrabi, Sohrabi, Miss Pavlov, Miss Zohreh, Miss Ohanian and many others.

Scenario writer and film director of the first Iranian film production. "Abi and Rabi", "Haji Agha, the Cinema Actor" "Tagor in Iran"
Author of Scenario "Reza Shah the Great" about which the Radio and Propaganda Department of the Government of Iran expressed its best opinion and which recently was presented to Mohammad Reza Shah Pahlavi appreciation received from the Prime Minister of Iran Dr. Eghbal.
INDIA: Founder of the first Motion Picture Institute for training actors and film directors. Some of his ex-students are now well-known film directors in India. 1937 – 39 President of the International Motion Picture Institute of Asia which has granted the first prizes for the best Indian Films in 1939.
"Pukar"of Sohrab Mody's Production.
"Admi" of V.Shantaram's Production.
Devika Rani and Moti Lal as the best screen actors of India in 1939.

In literature 
Member of the society of all Russian writers since 1929 in Moscow. Author of 64 literary works and books. "The
Member of the Photo and Motion Picture Exhibition of all Russia in 1928 in Moscow (O.D.S.K.)
One of five members of the Revision Commission of all Russian Film specialists in 1928 in Moscow (C.S.O.D.SK)
Founder and Secretary of all Turkmenistan Film Specialists in Ashkabad since 1928-1929.
President of Scenario writers of all Turkmenistan since 1928-1929.
He was Principal and Instructor in the cinema institute for 17 years for training of cinema actors and film directors 1925-1942.
Scenario writer and film director of the first Turkmenian film 'Gul and-Italmas' in 1929 in Ashkabad (Turkmenfilm)
Founder and Principal of the first Motion Picture School in Iran. This was later re-organised as the 'International Motion Picture Institute of Asia' which was accepted as one of the many institutions of the 'International Federation of Scientific Research Societies'.

Bureau of the International Motion Picture Institute:

Prof. Said Nafici – President. Prof. O.G. Ohanian – Acting President
Abbas Massoudi – Deputy. Prof. O.G. Ohanian (Senator). Ahmad Deikhan – General Secretary (M.P.). Ahavian – Joint Secretary. H. Moorad – Treasurer. Satu Roy – Representative in India. Ali Vakili (M.P.). Mirzayants (M.P.) as honorary members in India. Prof. Apte, Sohrab Modi, H.C. Sidwa (Globe Theatre), P.C. Patel (Opera House Cinema), P. K. Kapadia (Evergreen Pictures) in Bombay, Satu Roy (Film Director), Chandrasohekhar (Editor of Calcutta Dipaly weekly).

Founder of the film production and screen acting education in Iran from 1929 -
1936 whose honorary president was a well-known film director in Hollywood Mr William Cecil B. DeMille and Dr. Rabindranath Tagor (Honorary Member).

Amongst his pupils who received diplomas was the late Ahmad Deikhan (Member of Parliament), Shahnai, Gorji, Moorad, Kodbi, Rashidi, Kobadi, Sooltani, Edalatpoor, Saphi, Eng. Zarrabi, Sohrabi, Miss Pavlova, Miss Zohreh, Miss Ohanians and many others.

Scenario writer and film director of the first Iranian film productions – Abi and Rabi, Haji Agha, the Cinema Actor and Tagor in Iran.

Author of Scenario 'Reza Shah the Great' about which the Radio and Propaganda Department of the Government of Iran expressed its best opinion and which recently was presented to Mohammad Reza Shah Pahlavi and received an appreciation letter from D. Egbal the then Minister of Iran.

India: 1924 Founder of the first Motion Picture Institute for training screen actors and film directors. Some of his ex-students are now well known film directors in India.

1937-1939 – President of the International Motion Pictures Institute of Asia which has guaranteed first prizes for the best Indian films in 1939: –

'Pukar' of Sohrab Mody's Production Devika Rani and Moti Lal as the best
'Admi' of V. Shantaram's Production screen actors of India in 1939

Member of Society of all Russian writers since 1929 in Moscow. Author of 64 literary works and books. 'The Flaming Hearth' was dedicated to the late Robindranath Tagor and published in the Bombay Chronicles in 1941. 'The Valley of Dream' an Iranian legend, published in Paris in 1939, 'The Treasury of Timor Lang' published in Tehran in 1932.

A theatrical drama – 'Love Under the Wing of the Devil' published in 1917 in Ashkabad. His drama 'Coup d'État' from the life of the late Reza Shah the Great was personally accepted by His Imperial Majesty in 1932. In the preface of this drama which is a well-known literature in Iran – Professor Said Nafici – is expressing the opinion that this drama is the best example ever written in the history of Iranian literature.

About Indian life he has written the following – 'The Wandering Professor', 'The Seal of the King Asoka', 'The Indian Prince', 'The Emerald God', 'The Beautiful Lusi', 'The White Horseman', 'Her Revenge', etc.,

In theatre 

Director of the first Iranian Opera 'Parvaneh' in Teheran in 1932, Director and Author of the drama – 'The Lost Child' in Tehran in 1931; Director of the 'Arshin Mal-Alan' in Tehran in 1931; Director of 'The Coquette Lady' in Teheran in 1932 etc.

In science 

He has held the following positions:
Honorary Vice Consul of Iran in Siberia in 1921. 
Vice-President of the Academia Asiatic since 1932-1940 in Tehran.
Deputy President in Iran, India and Pakistan of the International Federation of Scientific Research Societies of Asia; Africa; Europe and America from 1932-1960
Professor in Iranian Police School in 1934 in Tehran.
Member of the Scientific Congress held in Calcutta in 1937, in Amsterdam in 1938 and in Heydarabad-Deccan in 1941.
Member of the Royal Central Asian Societies in London since 1951-1960
Member of the Committee International Academy of Sciences & Letters since 1952-1960

Inventions 
Special Parachute for landing supplies presented to the Army Headquarters in Mew-Delhi in 1941, etc.
Automatic Fire Control Apparatus' patented by Patent Office in Calcutta in 1953.
Helicopter lifting 500 passengers in 1955 Presented to the United Aircraft
Jet Helicopter lifting 1000 people in 1955 Corporation of U.S.A.

Personal life 
Three children with his wife Ashraf Karimzadeh: Orod Ohanian based in London England, Pavel Ohanian and Helen facchetti.

References

Pages Nos. 444 and 1136 the 'Year Book' published by 'The Times' of India in 1941-42 also 'Le Tout Cinema' published in Paris 1935-1940.
 

1896 births
People from Mashhad
1961 deaths
Iranian film directors
Silent film directors
20th-century Iranian inventors
Gerasimov Institute of Cinematography alumni
Iranian people of Armenian descent
Soviet emigrants to Iran
Iranian expatriates in India
Burials at Doulab Cemetery